The 2003 South American Rugby Championship "B" was the fourth edition of the competition of the second level national Rugby Union teams in South America.

The tournament was played in Bogota, with four team participating.

Venezuela won  for the first time the tournament, winning the direct match with Peru. Every team won at least one match. Brazil participate after lost, against Paraguay, the preliminary round for participating the 2003 "A" championship

Standings 
 Three point for victory, two for draw, and one for lost 
{| class="wikitable"
|-
!width=165|Team
!width=40|Played
!width=40|Won
!width=40|Drawn
!width=40|Lost
!width=40|For
!width=40|Against
!width=40|Difference
!width=40|Pts
|- bgcolor=#ccffcc align=center
|align=left| 
|3||2||0||1||102||73||+ 29||7
|- align=center
|align=left| 
|3||2||0||1||103||41||+ 62||7
|- align=center
|align=left| 
|3||1||0||2||54||99||- 45||5
|- align=center
|align=left| 
|3||1||0||2||42||88||- 46||5
|}

Results 

 First Round

Second Round

Third Round

References

2002
2003 rugby union tournaments for national teams
B
rugby union
rugby union
rugby union
rugby union
International rugby union competitions hosted by Colombia